Tsuyoshi Yamaguchi may refer to:

Tsuyoshi Yamaguchi (curler) (born 1984), Japanese curler
Tsuyoshi Yamaguchi (politician) (born 1954), Japanese politician